Depew Memorial Fountain is a freestanding fountain completed in 1919 and located in University Park in downtown Indianapolis, Indiana, within the Indiana World War Memorial Plaza.

Description 
The fountain is composed of multiple bronze figures arranged on a five-tier Stony Creek pink granite base with three basins.  The bronze sculptures depict fish, eight children dancing, and a woman on the topmost tier dancing and playing cymbals. The overall dimensions are approximately 25 x 45 x .

A memorial plaque is located on south side of the large granite basin.  It reads:

Artists 
 Alexander Stirling Calder (1870–1945, American)
 Karl Bitter (1867–1915, Austrian/American)
 Henry Bacon (1866–1924, American)

History 

University Park was redesigned in 1914 by George Edward Kessler for the park and boulevard system he had developed for the city of Indianapolis.  Depew Fountain was an original component of the plan and was designed by the sculptor Karl Bitter in the same year.

The Depew Memorial Fountain was commissioned in memory of Dr. Richard J. Depew by his wife, Emma Ely, following Dr. Depew's death in 1887.  When Mrs. Depew died in 1913, she had bequeathed $50,000 from her estate to the city of Indianapolis for the erection of a fountain in memory of her husband "in some park or public place where all classes of people may enjoy it."

An information plaque, located on the north side of the fountain, reads:

In 1926 young women from the Albertina Rasch ballet performed an interpretive dance around the fountain, mimicking the bronze sculptures thereon, to celebrate the 10th anniversary of the fountain.

References

Tourist attractions in Indianapolis
Outdoor sculptures in Indianapolis
Monuments and memorials in Indiana
Fountains in Indiana
1919 sculptures
Bronze sculptures in Indiana
Sculptures by Karl Bitter
Sculptures by Alexander Stirling Calder
Statues in Indianapolis
1919 establishments in Indiana
Sculptures of women in Indiana
Dance in art
Fish in art